Liptovská Mara is a reservoir in northern Slovakia, on the Váh river near Liptovský Mikuláš, in the Liptov region. The dam is named after one of the inundated villages.

It was built in 1965–1975. The area of the reservoir is 22 km², max. depth is 45 m and the capacity is 360 mil. m³. During construction, thirteen villages were inundated and a major railway and road relocated. The main purpose of this dam is to prevent floods, although it also generates electricity.

Today, the dam is used as a recreational site. The reconstructed Celtic oppidum Havránok is situated on a hill above the dam.

References

External links
 Liptovská Mara at Slovakia.travel
  

Dams in Slovakia
Buildings and structures in Žilina Region